Demián González (born ) is an Argentine male volleyball player. He was part of the Argentina men's national volleyball team at the 2010 FIVB Volleyball Men's World Championship in Italy. He was a part of the Argentina national team that ranked fifth place at the 2016 Rio de Janeiro Olympic Games.

Clubs 

 Argentina - Club de Amigos (2002/2006)
 Rumania - Tomis Constansa (2006/2007) 
 Argentina - Chubut Voley (2007/2008]
 Argentina - UPCN (2008/2015)
 Brazil - Kirin Club (2015/2016)
 Turquía - Halkbank Ankara (2016/2017)
 Argentina - Bolivar Voley (2016/2018)
 Brazil - Renata Volei (2018/2022)

References

1983 births
Living people
Argentine men's volleyball players
Place of birth missing (living people)
Olympic volleyball players of Argentina
Volleyball players at the 2016 Summer Olympics
21st-century Argentine people